Lucky Philip Dube (pronounced duu-beh; 3 August 1964 – 18 October 2007) was a South African reggae musician and rastafarian considered to be one of the most important musicians in the history of African music and one of the greatest reggae musicians of all time.The South African born but globally revered reggae legend recorded 22 albums in Zulu, English, and Afrikaans in a 25-year period and was South Africa's as well as Africa's biggest-selling reggae superstar to date. On the evening of 18 October 2007, Dube was murdered in the Johannesburg suburb of Rosettenville by hijackers who allegedly did not recognise him and assumed he was a Nigerian.

Biography

Early life
Lucky Dube was born in Ermelo, formerly of the Eastern Transvaal, now of Mpumalanga, on 3 August 1964. His parents separated before his birth, and he was raised by his mother, who named him Lucky because she considered his birth fortunate after a number of failed pregnancies. Along with his two siblings, Thandi and Mandla, Dube spent much of his childhood with his grandmother, Sarah, while his mother relocated to work. In a 1999 interview, he described his grandmother as "his greatest love" who "multiplied many things to bring up this responsible individual that I am today."

Beginning of his musical career
As a child Dube worked as a gardener but, as he matured, realizing that he wasn't earning enough to feed his family, he began to attend school. There he joined a choir and with some friends, formed his first musical ensemble called The Skyway Band. While at school he discovered the Rastafari movement. At the age of 18 Dube joined his cousin's band, The Love Brothers, playing Zulu pop music known as mbaqanga whilst funding his lifestyle by working for Hole and Cooke as a security guard at the car auctions in Midrand. The band signed with Teal Record Company, under Richard Siluma (Teal was later incorporated into Gallo Record Company). Though Dube was still at school, the band recorded material in Johannesburg during his school holidays. The resultant album was released under the name Lucky Dube and the Supersoul. The second album was released soon afterwards, and this time Dube wrote some of the lyrics in addition to singing. It was around this same time when he began to learn English.

Moving into reggae
On the release of his fifth album, Dave Segal (who became Dube's sound engineer) encouraged him to drop the "Supersoul" element of the name. All subsequent albums were recorded as Lucky Dube. At this time Dube began to note fans were responding positively to some reggae songs he played during live concerts. Drawing inspiration from Jimmy Cliff and Peter Tosh, he felt the socio-political messages associated with Jamaican reggae were relevant to a South African audience in an institutionally racist society.

He decided to try the new musical genre and in 1984, released the mini album Rastas Never Die. The record sold poorly – around 4000 units – in comparison to the 30,000 units his mbaqanga records would sell. Keen to suppress anti-apartheid activism, the apartheid regime banned the album in 1985, because of its critical lyrics, for instance in the song "War and Crime". However, he was not discouraged and continued to perform the reggae tracks live and wrote and produced a second reggae album. Think About The Children (1985). It achieved platinum sales status and established Dube as a popular reggae artist in South Africa, in addition to attracting attention outside his homeland.

Commercial and critical success 
Dube continued to release commercially successful albums. In 1989, he won four OKTV Awards for Prisoner, won another for Captured Live the following year and yet another two for House of Exile the year after. His 1993 album, Victims, sold over one million copies worldwide. In 1995, he earned a worldwide recording contract with Motown. His album Trinity was the first release on Tabu Records after Motown's acquisition of the label.

In 1996, he released a compilation album, Serious Reggae Business, which led to him being named the "Best Selling African Recording Artist" at the World Music Awards and the "International Artist of the Year" at the Ghana Music Awards. His next three albums each won South African Music Awards. His album, Respect, earned a European release through a deal with Warner Music. Dube toured internationally, sharing stages with artists such as Sinéad O'Connor, Peter Gabriel, and Sting. He appeared at the 1991 Reggae Sunsplash (uniquely that year, was invited back on stage for a 25-minute-long encore) and the 2005 Live 8 event in Johannesburg.

In addition to performing music Dube was a sometime actor, appearing in the feature films Voice in the Dark, Getting Lucky, and Lucky Strikes Back.

Lucky Dube is considered to be especially remarkable as a Dub Artist due to his lack of a diasporic cultural base. This was particularly due to the nature of Reggae and Dub being a platform for expression of displacement from the homeland. In Prisoner, the South African artist makes the genre his own by applying themes of apartheid and internal displacement. In the song and music video, he is found disturbing the bounds of the genre by highlighting the toils of his own homeland. He was revolutionary in so far as he introduced a competing version to Reggae's constant tendency of romanticizing the utopian homeland of Africa.

Dube took Dub and used it as a platform to promote racial equality within Africa during the Apartheid. He used dub to frame his arguments about colonialism and the African Slave trade, and how he felt that Africa should be reclaimed by the black race.

Death
On 18 October 2007, Lucky Dube was killed by hijackers in Rosettenville, a suburb in southern Johannesburg, shortly after dropping two of his seven children off at their uncle's house. Dube was driving his Chrysler 300C, which the assailants were after. Police reports suggest the hijackers did not recognise him and believed that he was a Nigerian. Five men were arrested in connection with the murder; three were tried and found guilty on 31 March 2009. Two of the men attempted to escape and were caught. The men were sentenced to life in prison.

Legacy
On 21 October 2008, Rykodisc released a compilation album entitled Retrospective, which featured many of Dube's most influential songs as well as previously unreleased tracks in the United States. The album celebrated Dube's music and honored the contributions he made to South Africa.
The Roots Reggae Library has taken steps to store digital versions of the Mbaqange albums made in the 80's. Five of the six albums have been retrieved. Ngikwethembe Na has yet to be found.

As one of the first artists to bring African reggae to the mainstream, Dube bridged cultural gaps within the African diaspora. What Lucky Dube's music did was "[present] a praxis of cross-culturality and visionary possibility" that the diaspora at large tends to erase. Dube gave Africa a voice and put its culture on the global stage by joining the global reggae community. Through taking Jamaican roots music back to its roots, he recontextualized the oppression and political struggles that reggae seeps itself in, bringing the basis of the diaspora back in conversation with the diaspora at large to allow for a more pan-African form of cultural expression. Dube's roots reggae brought African people to the table in terms of conversation about the black diaspora by mimicking Caribbean artists' assertions of African authenticity or racial utopia.  Lucky Dube ultimately shows how Africans have to find their way into the conversations of the Black Diaspora by mimicking their assertions of African authenticity or racial utopia. Dube catalyzed roots reggae's appearance as a popular form of protest song. This helped “legitimize and strengthen the oppositional gesture in popular African music and culture, particularly for those generations born after decolonization.

On 18 October 2017, Gallo Records South Africa released a 25 track limited edition commemorative album titled The Times We've Shared. The album features his biggest hits exclusive performances and 3 previously unreleased tracks.

In Australia, Lucky Dube's music has found resonance in remote Australian Aboriginal communities, and his popularity has led Lucky Dube to be called "Bigger than the Beatles" throughout much of central and northern Australia. In 2005, Dube was a touring act in Alice Springs, in central Australia, promoted by entrepreneur Scott Boocock, on advice from his friend,  Joe Miller, a disc jockey on local First Nations radio station CAAMA Radio, and he had noted that Dube's popularity was growing. Dube's Australian tour started in May 2005, and he played in Alice Springs (to a crowd of 4,000 people), Darwin, Northern Territory, and Cairns, Queensland.

Discography

Mbaqanga
 Lengane Ngeyethu (1981)
 Kudala Ngikuncenga (1982)
 Kukuwe (1983)
 Abathakathi (1984)
 Ngikwethembe Na? (1985)
 Umadakeni (1987)
 Usizi

Afrikaans
 Die Kaapse Dans ("Cape Dance") (1986) – as Oom Hansie
 Help My Krap ("Help Me Scratch") (1986) EP – as Oom Hansie

Reggae
 Rastas Never Dies (1984) EP
 Remember Me (1994)
 Think About the Children (1985)
 Slave (1987)
 Together As One (1988)
 Prisoner (1989)
 Captured Live (1990)
 House of Exile (1991)
 Victims (1993)
 Trinity (1995)
 Taxman (1997)
 The way It Is (1999)
 Soul Taker (2001)
 The Other Side (2003)
 Respect (2006)
 Different Colours It's not easyCompilation
 Serious Reggae Business (1996)
 Live in Jamaica (2000)
 The Rough Guide To Lucky Dube (2001)
 Lucky Dube Live in Uganda (2003)
 Retrospective (2008)
 The Ultimate Lucky Dube (2011)
 Lucky Dube meets Uganda's Buka Buka 2003
  Lucky Dube meets Rwanda's souve souve  2004
 The Times We've Shared (2017)The VictimReferences

Further reading
 Sean Barlow & Banning Eyre, Afropop! An Illustrated Guide to Contemporary African Music'' (Book Sales, August 1995). ,

External links
 'Photo-interview with sounds' produced by Classical Reggae Interviews. This interview was used by the BBC London to produce a radio report about the death of Lucky Dube!
 Lucky Dube at discogs.com

1964 births
2007 deaths
People from Ermelo, Mpumalanga
Zulu people
Deaths by firearm in South Africa
People murdered in Johannesburg
South African reggae musicians
South African male actors
South African murder victims
South African Rastafarians
Wrasse Records artists
Rykodisc artists
20th-century South African male singers
Afrikaans-language singers
Anti-apartheid activists
Roots Reggae Library
21st-century South African male singers
2007 murders in South Africa